Ružomberok is a town in northern Slovakia, in the historical Liptov region.  It has a population of around 27,000 inhabitants (45,000 with nearby villages).

Etymology
The name of the initial settlement located on today's Makovický street was Revúca (Slovak "roaring", derived from the Revúca river).  In its neighborhood, German colonists build a new settlement Rosenberg named after wild roses growing in the area. This name was later adopted by Slovaks as Ružomberok.

Geography
 
It is situated at the westernmost reaches of the Sub-Tatra Basin, more exactly its subdivision Liptov Basin, surrounded by the mountain ranges of Chočské vrchy, Greater Fatra and Low Tatras. Rivers flowing through the town are Váh, from east to west, Revúca, a left tributary from the south, on the way to Banská Bystrica and Likavka brook from the north, on the way to Dolný Kubín. The town is located around 65 km from Žilina, 190 km from Košice and 260 km from Bratislava (by road). Besides the main settlement, it also has "city parts" of Biely Potok, Černová, Hrboltová and Vlkolínec.

Climate
The climate is moderate, varies from hot in summer, to very cold in winter. There are four distinct seasons: spring (wet, moderate warm), summer (hot, very wet), autumn (dry) and winter (very cold). Ružomberok is located in the rain shadow of the mountain ranges of Greater Fatra and Chočské vrchy. Total annual precipitation is 727 mm. Annual average of days with snow cover is 68. The highest snow cover ever recorded was 92 cm. Extreme temperatures: high:  (2007), low:  (1949, 1986).

History
In 1233, King Andrew II of Hungary granted the land Revúca (terra Reuche) to his servant Hudko (Hudkonth, in the deed of confirmation Hudko). Hudko, his son Miloslav (Mylozou) and his offspring cultivated the land where the Slovak village Revúca had been founded in the 13th century. Before the 1320s, Germans founded a new settlement, Rosenberg (possesio Rozumberg), right on the hill near the older village. In 1329, Revúca became a part of Ružomberok and received a new name Podhora (Sub Monte).

In 1340, Charles I of Hungary confirmed the town rights: burgesses and "guests" (German colonists) had the same rights as in Ľupča (now Partizánska Ľupča). The extent of previous rights is not completely clear. Ružomberok allegedly had the similar rights since 1318, but the charter preserved only in copy could be fake. The Germans had had a dominant position probably until 1431 when many rich families left the town under the pressure of the Hussites. The town council was then controlled by Slovaks, and during the 15th century, the town was Slovakised.

In the 19th century, the town was one of the centres of the Slovak national movement. It slowly became one of the industrial and financial centres of the Kingdom of Hungary, particularly after the Kassa Oderberg Railway was completed in 1871, when many new factories emerged: paper and pulpwood works but also brick works (1871) and the textile industry.

In 1907, in Černová, which was rather a street than part of the town, had an event known as the Černová tragedy.

After the break-up of Austria-Hungary in 1918, Ružomberok became a part of Czechoslovakia. However, when Czechoslovakia was broken up in 1939, it was incorporated into the First Slovak Republic and was a capital of one of the counties, Tatra County (Tatranská župa). On 5 April 1945, Ružomberok was captured by troops of the I Czechoslovak Army Corps, acting as a part of the Soviet 4th Ukrainian Front. Ružomberok became again part of Czechoslovakia, and after the dissolution of Czechoslovakia in 1993, it became part of Slovakia. In 1995, Ruzomberok became a district town.

Demographics
According to the 2001 census, the town had 30,417 inhabitants. 96.64% of inhabitants were Slovaks, 0.95% Roma and 0.87% Czech. The religious make-up was 75.47% Roman Catholics, 14.65% people with no religious affiliation, and 5.46% Lutherans.

Industry and commerce 
Ružomberok was famous in the 20th century as an industrial town. The resulting pollution has remained one of the biggest challenges facing the town. It had the biggest cotton mill in Slovakia - BZVIL or Texicom - and still has one of the biggest Slovak exporter businesses - Mondi SCP, formerly known as SCP - Severoslovenske celulozky a papierne. Texicom went bankrupt in 2006. Mondi SCP is a paper and pulp factory and is the biggest employer in the Ruzomberok district and the Liptov region. The town also has a brick factory located in the south.

Ružomberok is nowadays also considered as a good shopping town, with almost all supermarket brands. These include Billa, Tesco, Lidl, Kaufland, Jednota, Hypernova, Verex and Kinekus. Aupark and Aldi are also planned.

Schools 
Apart from its numerous primary and secondary school, the town also has 2 grammar schools and 2 universities. The Catholic University is based in Ružomberok and the University of Žilina has a branch in the town. From September 2007 it is not possible to study at detached workplace of University of Žilina.

Landmarks and culture

The centre of the town is located at the Andrej Hlinka Square (Námestie Andreja Hlinku). Among the sights in or around the square are the Roman Catholic Church of St. Andrew, first mentioned in 1318 and originally built as a Gothic, but now is in a Renaissance-Baroque style; town hall, built in 1895 in the neo-Baroque style and the church and monastery of the Holy Cross (built 1806 and 1730 respectively).

Cultural institutions in the towns include the Liptov Museum, established in 1912 which also has exhibitions outside the town. These include the Likava Castle, which is just outside the town in the Likavka village; and the Museum of the Liptov Village in Pribylina.

The Ľudovít Fulla Gallery is a branch of the Slovak National Gallery and is dedicated to Fulla's works of art. The gallery is also a place for the regular series of concerts, called 'Hudba u Fullu' (Music at Fulla). In the recent years, the programme of the series has included works by composers such as Vladimír Godár, Peter Machajdík, Arvo Pärt, Philip Glass, Valentin Silvestrov, Gavin Bryars, and many others. From November 2–4, 2017 the Ľudovít Fulla Gallery hosted the international sound art and multimedia festival Sound Art vs. Multimedia.

The town also has the only scout museum in Slovakia.

Other sights within the town include the Evangelic church from 1923 to 1926, a historic building of the railway station from 1871, now protected as a national historic monument; Calvary above the town in the Classicist style, built in 1858; synagogue from 1880; and the church in Černová, where the tragedy in 1907 happened.

Attractions in the surroundings include the Čebrať mountain (1,054 m), Vlkolínec village, inscribed in 1993 to the UNESCO World Heritage Site list, and the skiing area of Malinô Brdo (also called Malinné).

Sport
The women's basketball team MBK Ružomberok is the most successful Slovak basketball team in the history with 2 EuroLeague Women victories. Ružomberok also has a successful football team, MFK Ružomberok, playing the highest division of the Slovak League - Slovak Superliga. In 2006, it won the Corgoň liga and also the Slovak FA Cup.

Famous people
Ľudovít Fulla, painter, graphic artist, illustrator, stage designer and art teacher
Dušan Galis, football coach and former football player
Andrej Hlinka, politician, priest, and activist
Peter Lorre (László Löwenstein), Hollywood actor
Elo Romančík, actor
Dárius Rusnák, ice hockey player
Karol Sidor, politician and journalist
Silvia Šuvadová, actress
Jozef Vengloš, former footballer, manager, and FIFA football expert

Twin towns — sister cities

Ružomberok is twinned with:

 Bački Petrovac, Serbia
 Gospić, Croatia
 Děčín, Czech Republic
 Hlučín, Czech Republic
 Kroměříž, Czech Republic
 Prague 6, Czech Republic

See also
Černová tragedy
Vlkolínec
Catholic University in Ružomberok
MFK Ružomberok
MBK Ružomberok

Gallery

References

External links
 Official website
 Local newspaper of Ružomberok
 City TV Ružomberok
 Cultural House of Andrej Hlinka

 
Cities and towns in Slovakia